The TVX Broadcast Group was an American media company that owned a group of UHF television stations during the 1980s. Originally known as the Television Corp. of Virginia, the company was headquartered in Norfolk, Virginia, and was founded by a group led by television executive Timothy McDonald and local media personality-turned radio executive Gene Loving. TVX began with a start-up television station, WTVZ, in 1979.

Despite the group's name, TVX Broadcast Group was not connected to, nor ever held any interest in WTVX in Fort Pierce, Florida and KTVX in Salt Lake City, Utah.

History

Origins
In the late 1970s, the Hampton Roads area (as the region around Norfolk is known) was unique in that it was one of the smallest markets to have four commercial television stations: NBC affiliate WAVY-TV, CBS station WTAR-TV, ABC affiliate WVEC-TV, and independent station WYAH-TV. The latter station, however, was owned by the Portsmouth-based evangelist Pat Robertson's Christian Broadcasting Network, and ran a fairly conservative program schedule. The Loving/McDonald group secured a construction permit for Norfolk's vacant channel 33 in May 1978 and signed it a year later. WTVZ experienced early success, mostly through airing a moderate amount of programming that had been considered too objectionable for WYAH-TV.

Based on the early success of WTVZ, TVX decided to expand outside of Hampton Roads. TVX's second station was WRLH-TV in Richmond, in February 1982. Ironically, CBN was going to build a station in the same area but donated it to a non-commercial religious group. As a result, WRLH was the only independent station in Richmond for its first few years of operation.

Expansion
TVX's first two acquisitions were in North Carolina: WJTM-TV (later WNRW and now WXLV-TV) in Winston-Salem in 1980, and WLFL in Raleigh in 1985. WNOL-TV in New Orleans followed in 1985, and the construction permit for KMJD-TV in Pine Bluff, Arkansas was bought by TVX and signed on as KJTM-TV (now KASN) in June 1986.

Along with buying stations, TVX was building them as well. The company launched WMKW-TV (now WLMT) in Memphis in April 1983, followed by WCAY-TV (now WUXP-TV) in Nashville in February 1984. KRRT (now KMYS) in Kerrville, Texas was signed on in November 1985 as the San Antonio market's first English-language independent station.  All of these stations used the branding "Prime All The Time." TVX's last station, WNYB-TV (now WNYO-TV) in Buffalo, was sold just before its September 1987 sign-on to Niagara Frontier Hockey, the owners of the Buffalo Sabres.

TVX sold WRLH-TV to the Baltimore-based A.S. Abell Company, then-publisher of the Baltimore Sun, in 1985. In mid-1986, the new Fox Broadcasting Company approached TVX with an affiliation deal for the company's New Orleans station. TVX agreed, but on the condition that Fox also took on TVX's other properties as affiliates. Fox added one stipulation: if one of TVX's underperforming stations was sold, Fox could then pull its affiliation from that station.

Once the group deal for WLFL was closed, TVX had to sell WNRW-TV in Winston-Salem, due to a large signal overlap with the larger WLFL, and as a result, TVX could not keep both stations (FCC rules did not allow common-grade signal overlap, and could not gave them a waiver until 2000). TVX opted to keep the larger WLFL and sell WNRW to Act III Broadcasting, becoming the first acquisition.

Integrations
In February 1987, TVX acquired five stations from the Taft Broadcasting Company, which was in the middle of a corporate restructuring. The stations purchased were Fox affiliates WTAF-TV in Philadelphia and WCIX in Miami; and independent stations WDCA-TV in Washington, D.C., KTXA in Fort Worth, Texas, and KTXH in Houston. The purchase of the Taft stations, while transforming TVX's profile from a small company into a large-market broadcaster, had a major negative impact: TVX acquired massive debt as well, resulting in the company selling many of their medium- and small-market outlets.

Between late 1987 and the end of 1989, TVX found new owners for eight stations, though most were to satisfy Federal Communications Commission requirements on group ownership. Notable sales were those of WNOL-TV, to a group led by musician Quincy Jones; of WTVZ, TVX's first station, to Sullivan Broadcasting; of the two Tennessee stations (WCAY-TV and WMKW-TV), which were sold to MT Communications, who also bought out WETO in the Tri-Cities region, and of WCIX, whose status as the company's only VHF outlet played a factor in TVX's reluctant sale of the station to CBS in 1988. Fox, on the other hand, exercised the clause in the 1986 group affiliation contract and pulled its programming from several former TVX stations as soon as the sales were finalized. Also during this period, company co-founder Tim McDonald departed the firm after negotiating a financial restructuring with Salomon Brothers to help resolve the company's debt issues. Salomon Brothers would eventually become TVX's major shareholder.

Despite having stripped itself down to a six-station group, made up mostly of profitable, highly-performing outlets in large markets, the sales of the smaller stations did not fully reduce TVX's debt load. In 1989, Salomon Brothers sold a minority share (about 22 percent) of TVX to Paramount Pictures. In 1991 Paramount acquired the rest of TVX and bought the group under its corporate umbrella, rechristening the company as the Paramount Stations Group. In 1994, the original iteration of Viacom acquired the stations as part of its purchase of Paramount Pictures.

Former TVX-owned stations

Notes:
 Two boldface asterisks appearing following a station's call letters (**) indicate a station that was built and signed on by TVX;
 Three boldface asterisks (***) indicate a station built by TVX but sold to another entity before it signed on.

See also
 Westinghouse Broadcasting
 ABC Owned Television Stations

References

Defunct television broadcasting companies of the United States
Defunct companies based in Virginia
Television stations in Virginia
Mass media companies established in 1979
Mass media companies disestablished in 1991
1979 establishments in Virginia
1991 disestablishments in Virginia